The 2nd Cannes International Series Festival is a television festival that took place from 5 to 10 April 2019 in Cannes, France.

The closing ceremony was hosted by French comedian Monsieur Poulpe and aired live on Canal+. Spanish comedy series Perfect Life won the Best Series of the festival.

Juries
The following juries were named for the festival. English actor Stephen Fry was set to jury the competition section but withdrew his participation.

Competition
Baran bo Odar, German director and screenwriter, Jury President
Miriam Leone, Italian actress
Emma Mackey, French-British actress
Katheryn Winnick, Canadian actress
Robin Coudert, French composer

Short Form Competition
Greg Garcia, American director and producer, Jury President
Fanny Sidney, French actress
Josefine Frida Pettersen, Norwegian actress

Official selection

In competition
The following series were selected to compete:

Short Form Competition
The following series were selected to compete:

Out of competition
The following series were screened out of competition:

Awards
The following awards were presented at the festival:
Best Series: Perfect Life by Leticia Dolera
Best Screenplay: Bert Van Dael and Sanne Nuyens for The Twelve
Best Music: Christoph M. Kaiser and Julian Maas for Bauhaus: A New Era
Special Interpretation Prize: Perfect Life by Leticia Dolera
Best Performance: Reshef Levi for Nehama
Best Short Form Series: Over and Out by Christiaan Van Vuuren and Adele Vuko

Special awards
The following honorary awards were presented at the festival:
Variety Icon Award: Diana Rigg
Serieously Award: Lindsey Morgan
Excellence Award: Dominic West

References

2019 in French television